Mouk is a French animated television series produced by Millimages, adapted from the work of Marc Boutavant, and directed by François Narboux. 62 episodes were produced. The show has aired in Canada and the United Kingdom, as well as other countries.

Synopsis 
The show is about two bike-riding travelers, Mouk and Chavapa, who have adventures as they travel around the world.

Each episode begins with Mouk and Chavapa chatting via webcam to their friends Popo and Mita back home. The friends say how excited they are to tell Mouk and Chavapa something interesting that has happened to them, but before they can, Mouk interrupts with a story of his travels. The friends usually do not get the chance to tell their story.

Characters

Main
Mouk, the show's namesake is a brown bear (voiced by Rachel Williams)
Chavapa, his companion, is a grey cat (voiced by Tania Farchy)
Mita is a girl they correspond with via computer (voiced by Lisa Jacobs)
Popo is Mita's brother, who they also speak with a thick British accent (also voiced by Lisa Jacobs)

Recurring

Abby/Abey and Tadi are Canadians who appear in "Shooting Star" and "Hockey"
Bouba lives in Africa and appears in "Good as New" and "The Whistling Language"
Cassandra lives in Crete, in Greece, and appears in "Bicycle Race", "Little Fish Grow Up", "The (Olive/Village) Festival", "Pottery" and the game
Joropo and Raina live in Venezuela and appear in "The Great Crossing", "Instruments Do Grow on Trees!" and the game
Kalpita lives in India and appears in "Holi" and "The Indian Vase"
Lin(h) Hue lives in Vietnam and appears in "In the Paddy Fields", "The Bamboo Plantation" and "Puppet Masters"
Miko lives in Tokyo, Japan, and appears in "Small Is Beautiful", "Runaway Robot" and the game
Kanaki loves in Tokyo, Japan and appears in "Kabuki" and "Mouk's Birthday"
Sidney lives in Australia and appears in "Wallabies' Rock" and "Windmill"

Cast

Episodes

Broadcast
In Canada, this airs on TVOKids. In the United States, Ultra Kidz premiered the series in Spanish on 4 September 2017. In Brazil, it is airing by TV Escola
and ZooMoo. In the United Kingdom, it airs on Disney Junior. In the United States, it is airing now on Sprout.

Other broadcasters:

United States: V-me, Sprout
Russia: Carousel
Philippines: TV5
Singapore: Okto on 5
Spain: Boing
Australia: ABC2, ABC Kids
Hungary: M2

Games
TVOKids has a flash game based on the show where several regions can be explored with an associated character.
Canada with Ameruk
Crete with Cassandra
India with Kalpita
Japan with Miko
Venezuela with Raina

References

External links 
 

2010s French animated television series
2010s preschool education television series
2011 French television series debuts
2014 French television series endings
Animated preschool education television series
Animated television series about bears
French children's animated comedy television series
French flash animated television series
French preschool education television series
French television shows based on children's books